mioty is a low-power wide-area network (LPWAN) protocol. It is using telegram splitting, a standardized LPWAN technology in the license-free spectrum. This technology splits a data telegram into multiple sub packets and sends them after applying error correcting codes, in a partly predefined time and frequency pattern. This makes a transmission robust to interferences and packet collisions. It is standardised in the TS 103 357 ETSI. Its uplink operates at the 868 MHz band, license free in Europe, and 916MHz band in North America. It requires a bandwidth of 200 kHz for two channels (e.g. up- and downlink).

Technology attributes
 Long range: The operating range of LPWAN technology varies from a few kilometers in urban areas to over 10 km in rural settings. It can also enable effective data communication in previously infeasible indoor and underground locations.
 Low power: Optimized for power consumption, LPWAN transceivers can run on small, inexpensive batteries for up to 20 years.
 Telegram splitting: (or TSMA, telegram splitting multiple access) Splits the packets of data under transport in small sub-packets at the sensor level. The small packets getting then transmitted over variable frequency and time.
 More than a million packets a day. 
 Serving moving clients. It can serve data from clients moving at up to 120km/hr.

Applications
It is intended to be used for monitoring devices in large areas.

See also
 Internet of Things

References

Wide area networks
Wireless networking